Gary Dahl may refer to:
Gary G. Dahl (born 1940), member of the Illinois Senate
Gary Dahl (businessman) (1936–2015), originator of Pet Rocks

See also
Gary Dale Farmer (born 1953), Canadian actor